The ATP Bolzano was a men's tennis tournament played in Bolzano, Italy.  The event was played as part of the ATP World Series of the ATP Tour in 1992 and 1993.  It was played on indoor carpet courts.

Finals

Singles

Doubles

External links
 ATP World Tour archive

Carpet court tennis tournaments
Indoor tennis tournaments
Defunct tennis tournaments in Italy
ATP Tour
Recurring sporting events established in 1992
Recurring sporting events disestablished in 1993
1992 establishments in Italy
1993 disestablishments in Italy
Sport in Bolzano